Dum Dums (stylized as Dum•Dums) are an American brand of spherical lollipops.

History 
Dum Dums originated from Akron Candy Company in Bellevue, Ohio, in 1924.  I.C. Bahr, the early sales manager of the company, named them, thinking "Dum Dums" was a phrase any child could say. In 1953, Dum Dums were purchased by the Spangler Candy Company and moved manufacturing to Bryan, Ohio. 

Initially, there were 7 flavors: lemon, lime, orange, coconut-pineapple, cherry, grape, and butterscotch.

Spangler once experimented with plastic sticks instead of the current paper sticks, but they were met with complaints of potential injury due to the possible breakage of the unbending plastic in manufacturing leading to plastic fragments in the candy.

Flavors
Dum Dums are now made in 16 flavors, with new flavors rotating into the mix every so often.  The "Mystery Flavor" is the result of the end of one batch mixing with the next batch, rather than stopping production to clean machines in between flavors.

See also
List of confectionery brands

References

External links
 Dum Dums (official website)

Brand name confectionery
Products introduced in 1924
Lollipops